Morten Morland (born 1979) is a Norwegian political cartoonist working in the United Kingdom. Since 2002, his work is regularly featured in The Times newspaper.

In 2008, Morland won the Political Cartoon Society's Low Trophy for Political Cartoonist of the Year. In 2007, he won the society's Gillray Goblet for runner-up Cartoonist of the Year.

Morland, who studied graphic design at The Surrey Institute of Art and Design, is also known for his animations for The Times and sister title The Sunday Times. He has been producing them since 2002.

References

External links 
 

1979 births
Living people
Norwegian cartoonists
The Spectator people